"Sunshine on a Rainy Day" is a 1990 song by British pop singer and songwriter Zoë, released as the first single from her debut album, Scarlet Red and Blue (1991). The song received positive reviews from music critics, reaching number four on the UK Singles Chart in September 1991. It also charted within the top 40 in Ireland, Luxembourg, Sweden and Zimbabwe, where it reached number-one. Two different music videos were produced to promote the single. One of them was filmed in India. In 2008, Zoë re-recorded the song with her folk band Mama. This version is available on their debut CD, Crow Coyote Buffalo.

Background
The song was originally released at the end of 1990, when it only managed to reach number 53 on the UK Singles Chart. The following year, English record producer Mark 'Spike' Stent remixed the track and re-released it on 12 August 1991. This version reached number four on the same chart and became Zoë's biggest hit. It was the 18th best-selling single of 1991. The track was used in UK advertisements for the Amiga 500 computer, which added to its popularity. It was also on Capital Radio's A-list.

Critical reception
Larry Flick from Billboard wrote, "Photogenic British lass steps from out of left field with a percussive, midtempo gem on which she often comes across like a smoky Sophie B. Hawkins. Soft, syncopated hip-hop-derived beats support acoustic strumming, subtle electric chords, and flower-child lyrical prose. Track starts from a simple, sparse point, and builds to a rousing tambourine-shaking climax. Fueled with multiformat appeal." Randy Clark from Cashbox described it as a "brooding club track". James Hamilton from Music Week called it a "'Tom's Diner' inspired hypnotic folksy singalong roller, a real "sleeper" last autumn, now slightly remixed." 

Jack Barron from NME wrote, "'Sunshine on a Rainy Day' is an excellent anthem in every way being musically and lyrically direct. The tune builds from an acoustic beginning layering more guitars and harmonies into a fairy cake of a song. Written by Zoe and Youth and mixed by Andy and Ben Boilerhouse, it is touched with spirit and heart giving every indication on this tune that Zoe is destined to become a very bright star indeed." Another editor felt the song is "a must for this summer" and "a certain Top 10 in the current climate". Sophie Lawrence reviewed the song for Smash Hits, commenting, "It's a bit Belinda Carlisle-ish." She added, "I love it. It's really folky. She's got a brilliant voice. That's a record I'd definitely go out and buy." Another editor, Mark Frith, stated that "Sunshine on a Rainy Day" has become "an anthem of unparalleled exuberance".

Track listings
 7-inch single (1990)
A. "Sunshine on a Rainy Day" (7-inch version)
B. "Sunshine on a Rainy Day" (accapella mix)

 CD single (1990)
 "Sunshine on a Rainy Day" (7-inch version)
 "Sunshine on a Rainy Day" (Mellow Mix)
 "Sunshine on a Rainy Day" (accapella mix)

 7-inch and cassette single (1991)
 "Sunshine on a Rainy Day" (7-inch radio mix 1991)
 "Sunshine on a Rainy Day" (original 7-inch mix 1990)

Charts

Weekly charts

Year-end charts

Christine Anu version

In May 2000, Australian singer-songwriter Christine Anu released a version of the song as the first single from her second studio album, Come My Way. The song peaked at number 26 on the Australian Singles Chart and remained in the top 50 for 15 weeks.

Track listing
 Australian CD single
 "Sunshine on a Rainy Day" (radio mix)
 "Sunshine on a Rainy Day" (Wicked Beat Sound System Mix)
 "Sunshine on a Rainy Day" (Scotia Nostre Mix)

Charts

Other versions
In 1994, Naomi Campbell covered the song on her album, Baby Woman.
The song was covered by Emma Bunton on her debut solo album A Girl Like Me in 2001.
A version by dance artists Ed Real & Mark Richardson was released in 2003 on Nukleuz Records.
Happy hardcore versions include "Sunshine" by Slipmatt and Eruption, and "Sunshine on a Rainy Day" by DJ Stompy.

References

1990 debut singles
1990 songs
1991 singles
2000 singles
British pop songs
Christine Anu songs
Emma Bunton songs
Mushroom Records singles
Number-one singles in Zimbabwe
Polydor Records singles
Songs written by Youth (musician)